Agar ( or ), or agar-agar, is a jelly-like substance consisting of  polysaccharides obtained from the cell walls of some species of red algae, primarily from "ogonori" (Gracilaria) and "tengusa" (Gelidiaceae). As found in nature, agar is a mixture of two components, the linear polysaccharide agarose and a heterogeneous mixture of smaller molecules called agaropectin.  It forms the supporting structure in the cell walls of certain species of algae and is released on boiling. These algae are known as agarophytes, belonging to the Rhodophyta (red algae) phylum.  The processing of food-grade agar removes the agaropectin, and the commercial product is essentially pure agarose.

Agar has been used as an ingredient in desserts throughout Asia and also as a solid substrate to contain culture media for microbiological work. Agar can be used as a laxative; an appetite suppressant; a vegan substitute for gelatin; a thickener for soups; in fruit preserves, ice cream, and other desserts; as a clarifying agent in brewing; and for sizing paper and fabrics.

Etymology 
The word "agar" comes from agar-agar, the Malay name for red algae (Gigartina, Eucheuma, Gracilaria) from which the jelly is produced. It is also known as Kanten (from the phrase kan-zarashi tokoroten or “cold-exposed agar”), Japanese isinglass,  China grass, Ceylon moss or Jaffna moss. Gracilaria lichenoides is specifically referred to as agal-agal or Ceylon agar.

History 

Jelly seaweeds were favoured and foraged by Malay communities living on the coasts of the Riau Archipelago and Singapore in Southeast Asia for centuries.

The application of agar as a food additive may have been discovered in Japan in 1658 by Mino Tarōzaemon, an innkeeper in current Fushimi-ku, Kyoto who, according to legend, was said to have discarded surplus seaweed soup (Tokoroten) and noticed that it gelled later after a winter night's freezing. Over the following centuries, agar became a common gelling agent in several Asian cuisines.

Agar was first subjected to chemical analysis in 1859 by the French chemist Anselme Payen, who had obtained agar from the marine algae Gelidium corneum.

Beginning in the late 19th century, agar began to be used as a solid medium for growing various microbes. Agar was first described for use in microbiology in 1882 by the German microbiologist Walther Hesse, an assistant working in Robert Koch's laboratory, on the suggestion of his wife Fanny Hesse. Agar quickly supplanted gelatin as the base of microbiological media, due to its higher melting temperature, allowing microbes to be grown at higher temperatures without the media liquefying.

With its newfound use in microbiology, agar production quickly increased. This production centered on Japan, which produced most of the world's agar until World War II. However, with the outbreak of World War II, many nations were forced to establish domestic agar industries in order to continue microbiological research. Around the time of World War II, approximately 2,500 tons of agar were produced annually. By the mid-1970s, production worldwide had increased dramatically to approximately 10,000 tons each year. Since then, production of agar has fluctuated due to unstable and sometimes over-utilized seaweed populations.

Composition 

Agar consists of a mixture of two polysaccharides: agarose and agaropectin, with agarose making up about 70% of the mixture. Agarose is a linear polymer, made up of repeating units of agarobiose, a disaccharide made up of D-galactose and 3,6-anhydro-L-galactopyranose. Agaropectin is a heterogeneous mixture of smaller molecules that occur in lesser amounts, and is made up of alternating units of D-galactose and L-galactose heavily modified with acidic side-groups, such as sulfate and pyruvate.

Agar exhibits hysteresis, solidifying at about 32–40 °C (305–313 K, 90–104 °F) but melting at 85 °C (358  K, 185 °F). This property lends a suitable balance between easy melting and good gel stability at relatively high temperatures. Since many scientific applications require incubation at temperatures close to human body temperature (37 °C), agar is more appropriate than other solidifying agents that melt at this temperature, such as gelatin.

Uses

Culinary 

Agar-agar is a natural vegetable gelatin counterpart. It is white and semi-translucent when sold in packages as washed and dried strips or in powdered form. It can be used to make jellies, puddings, and custards. When making jelly, it is boiled in water until the solids dissolve. Sweetener, flavoring, coloring, fruits and or vegetables are then added, and the liquid is poured into molds to be served as desserts and vegetable aspics or incorporated with other desserts such as a layer of jelly in a cake.

Agar-agar is approximately 80% dietary fiber, so it can serve as an intestinal regulator. Its bulking quality has been behind fad diets in Asia, for example the kanten (the Japanese word for agar-agar) diet. Once ingested, kanten triples in size and absorbs water. This results in the consumers feeling fuller.

Asian culinary 
One use of agar in Japanese cuisine (Wagashi) is anmitsu, a dessert made of small cubes of agar jelly and served in a bowl with various fruits or other ingredients. It is also the main ingredient in mizu yōkan, another popular Japanese food. In Philippine cuisine, it is used to make the jelly bars in the various gulaman refreshments like Sago't Gulaman, Samalamig, or desserts such as buko pandan, agar flan, halo-halo, fruit cocktail jelly, and the black and red gulaman used in various fruit salads. In Vietnamese cuisine, jellies made of flavored layers of agar agar, called thạch, are a popular dessert, and are often made in ornate molds for special occasions. In Indian cuisine, agar is used for making desserts. In Burmese cuisine, a sweet jelly known as kyauk kyaw is made from agar. Agar jelly is widely used in Taiwanese bubble tea.

Other culinary 
It can be used as addition to or as a replacement for pectin in jams and marmalades, as a substitute to gelatin for its superior gelling properties, and as a strengthening ingredient in souffles and custards. Another use of agar-agar is in a Russian dish ptich'ye moloko (bird's milk), a rich jellified custard (or soft meringue) used as a cake filling or chocolate-glazed as individual sweets. 

Agar-agar may also be used as the gelling agent in gel clarification, a culinary technique used to clarify stocks, sauces, and other liquids. Mexico has traditional candies made out of Agar gelatin, most of them in colorful, half-circle shapes that resemble a melon or watermelon fruit slice, and commonly covered with sugar. They are known in Spanish as Dulce de Agar (Agar sweets)

Agar-agar is an allowed nonorganic/nonsynthetic additive used as a thickener, gelling agent, texturizer, moisturizer, emulsifier, flavor enhancer, and absorbent in certified organic foods.

Microbiology

Agar plate 

An agar plate or Petri dish is used to provide a growth medium using a mix of agar and other nutrients in which microorganisms, including bacteria and fungi, can be cultured and observed under the microscope. Agar is indigestible for many organisms so that microbial growth does not affect the gel used and it remains stable. Agar is typically sold commercially as a powder that can be mixed with water and prepared similarly to gelatin before use as a growth medium. Nutrients are typically added to meet the nutritional needs of the microbes organism, the formulations of which may be "undefined" where the precise composition is unknown, or "defined" where the exact chemical composition is known.  Agar is often dispensed using a sterile media dispenser.

Different algae produce various types of agar. Each agar has unique properties that suit different purposes. Because of the agarose component, the agar solidifies. When heated, agarose has the potential to melt and then solidify. Because of this property, they are referred to as "physical gels." In contrast, polyacrylamide polymerization is an irreversible process, and the resulting products are known as chemical gels. 

There are a variety of different types of agar that support the growth of different microorganisms. A nutrient agar may be permissive, allowing for the cultivation of any non-fastidious microorganisms; a commonly-used nutrient agar for bacteria is the Luria Bertani (LB) agar which contains lysogeny broth, a nutrient-rich medium used for bacterial growth. Other fastidious organisms may require the addition of different biological fluids such as horse or sheep blood, serum, egg yolk, and so on.  Agar plates can also be selective, and can be used to promote the growth of bacteria of interest while inhibiting others.  A variety of chemicals may be added to create an environment favourable for specific types of bacteria or bacteria with certain properties, but not conducive for growth of others. For example, antibiotics may be added in cloning experiments whereby bacteria with antibiotic-resistant plasmid are selected.

Motility assays 
As a gel, an agar or agarose medium is porous and therefore can be used to measure microorganism motility and mobility. The gel's porosity is directly related to the concentration of agarose in the medium, so various levels of effective viscosity (from the cell's "point of view") can be selected, depending on the experimental objectives.

A common identification assay involves culturing a sample of the organism deep within a block of nutrient agar. Cells will attempt to grow within the gel structure. Motile species will be able to migrate, albeit slowly, throughout the gel, and infiltration rates can then be visualized, whereas non-motile species will show growth only along the now-empty path introduced by the invasive initial sample deposition.

Another setup commonly used for measuring chemotaxis and chemokinesis utilizes the under-agarose cell migration assay, whereby a layer of agarose gel is placed between a cell population and a chemoattractant. As a concentration gradient develops from the diffusion of the chemoattractant into the gel, various cell populations requiring different stimulation levels to migrate can then be visualized over time using microphotography as they tunnel upward through the gel against gravity along the gradient.

Plant biology 

Research grade agar is used extensively in plant biology as it is optionally supplemented with a nutrient and/or vitamin mixture that allows for seedling germination in Petri dishes under sterile conditions (given that the seeds are sterilized as well). Nutrient and/or vitamin supplementation for Arabidopsis thaliana is standard across most experimental conditions. Murashige & Skoog (MS) nutrient mix and Gamborg's B5 vitamin mix in general are used. A 1.0% agar/0.44% MS+vitamin dH2O solution is suitable for growth media between normal growth temps.

When using agar, within any growth medium, it is important to know that the solidification of the agar is pH-dependent. The optimal range for solidification is between 5.4 and 5.7. Usually, the application of potassium hydroxide is needed to increase the pH to this range. A general guideline is about 600 µl 0.1M KOH per 250 ml GM. This entire mixture can be sterilized using the liquid cycle of an autoclave.

This medium nicely lends itself to the application of specific concentrations of phytohormones etc. to induce specific growth patterns in that one can easily prepare a solution containing the desired amount of hormone, add it to the known volume of GM, and autoclave to both sterilize and evaporate off any solvent that may have been used to dissolve the often-polar hormones. This hormone/GM solution can be spread across the surface of Petri dishes sown with germinated and/or etiolated seedlings.

Experiments with the moss Physcomitrella patens, however, have shown that choice of the gelling agent – agar or Gelrite – does influence phytohormone sensitivity of the plant cell culture.

Other uses 
Agar is used:
 As an impression material in dentistry.
 As a medium to precisely orient the tissue specimen and secure it by agar pre-embedding (especially useful for small endoscopy biopsy specimens) for histopathology processing
 To make salt bridges and gel plugs for use in electrochemistry.
 In formicariums as a transparent substitute for sand and a source of nutrition.
 As a natural ingredient in forming modeling clay for young children to play with.
 As an allowed biofertilizer component in organic farming.
 As a substrate for precipitin reactions in immunology.
 At different times as a substitute for gelatin in photographic emulsions, arrowroot in preparing silver paper and as a substitute for fish glue in resist etching.
 As an MRI elastic gel phantom to mimic tissue mechanical properties in Magnetic Resonance Elastography
Gelidium agar is used primarily for bacteriological plates. Gracilaria agar is used mainly in food applications.

In 2016, AMAM, a Japanese company, developed a prototype for Agar-based commercial packaging system called Agar Plasticity, intended as a replacement for oil-based plastic packaging.

See also

References

External links

Edible thickening agents
Microbiological gelling agent
Dental materials
Algal food ingredients
Red algae
Gels
Polysaccharides
Japanese inventions
Food stabilizers
Jams and jellies
E-number additives
Impression material